Fancy pigeon refers to any breed of domestic pigeon, which is a domesticated form of the wild rock dove (Columba livia). They are bred by pigeon fanciers for various traits relating to size, shape, color, and behavior, and often exhibited at pigeon shows, fairs and other livestock exhibits.

There are about 800 pigeon breeds; considering all regional varieties all over the world there may be 1100 breeds. The European list of fancy pigeons alone names about 500 breeds. No other domestic animal has branched out into such a variety of forms and colours.

Charles Darwin is known to have crossbred fancy pigeons, particularly the Ice Pigeon, to study variation within species, this work coming three years before his groundbreaking publication, On the Origin of Species.

Pigeon showing

Pigeon fanciers from many different countries exhibit their birds at local, inter-state or national shows and compete against one another for prizes. One typical country show in Australia in 2008 had hundreds of pigeons on display and prizes for the winners. In England, the Philoperisteron Society conducted annual shows in the mid 1800s. There were also a London Columbarian Society. The extensive variations in the breeds attracted the attention of Charles Darwin and played a major role in developing ideas on evolution.

Some fanciers organize exhibitions exclusively for pigeons; one held in Blackpool run by the Royal Pigeon Racing Association is annually attended by about 25,000 people and generates around £80,000 profit, which is donated to charity. 

The largest pigeon show is held in Nuremberg: the German National Pigeon Show, which had over 33,500 pigeons at the 2006 show.

In the United States, there are hundreds of local, state and national pigeon clubs that sponsor shows. The largest shows are the National Young Bird Show, held in Louisville, Kentucky in October, and the National Pigeon Association's Grand National, held in a different city each year and usually in January.

Major breed families
This grouping system is adapted from Australian Fancy Pigeons National Book of Standards. Consideration was given to the new UK standards book which followed the German and European grouping. This version differs slightly from that of the European grouping; the following system is arbitrary and used solely for organizing breed articles until a grouping can be accepted worldwide.

Asian feather and voice pigeons

This group includes breeds developed for extensive feathering that originated in the Asian region, as well as breeds cultivated for their trumpeting, or laughing, voice.
 Fantail
 Frillback
 Jacobin
 Lahore
 Trumpeter
 English Trumpeter

Colour pigeons

Most of these pigeons originate in Germany, and are sometimes listed as German Toys. There are many different varieties, with a wide selection of colours and markings.
 Archangel pigeon
 Danish Suabian
 Saxon Field Pigeon
 Starling
 Swallow
 Thuringen Field Pigeon
 Ice Pigeon

Frills and Owls

The word "frill" here relates to the reversed feathering on the chest of these varieties. This group is also noted for having short beaks.
 Aachen Lacquer Shield Owl
 African Owl
 Chinese Owl
 Italian Owl
 Old German Owl
 Oriental Frill
 Turbit

Homer and Hen Pigeons

Homing pigeons

This group includes breeds originally developed for their homing ability, and includes show-type racing pigeons.
 American Show Racer
 Dragoon
 English Carrier
 German Beauty Homer
 Homing pigeon

Pouters and Croppers

This group includes breeds developed for the ability to inflate their crops.
 English Pouter
 Brunner Pouter
 Gaditano Pouter
 Holle Cropper
 Horseman Pouter
 Norwich Cropper
 Pigmy Pouter
 Pouter
 Voorburg shield cropper
 Old German Croppers
Magpi pouter

Exhibition Tumblers

This group originally consisted of flying/tumbler breeds, but has now been refined to include only purely ornamental/exhibition breeds.
 Budapest Short-faced Tumbler
 English Long-faced Tumbler
 English Short-faced Tumbler
 Helmet
 English Magpie
 Nun

Flying Tumblers and Highfliers

This group is dual purpose in that its members can be shown, but also retain acrobatic or sporting ability and can therefore be used in flying competitions. Flying tumbler varieties belong in this group. Although many varieties in this grouping have become primarily show varieties, they are still expected to display characteristics of performing birds.
 Armenian Tumbler
 Australian Performing Tumbler
 Danzig Highflyer
 Donek
 Roller
 Tippler

Utility pigeons

This group includes breeds originally developed as sources of meat.
 Carneau
 French Mondain
 King pigeon
 American Giant Runt
 Strasser pigeon

See also

 Domestic pigeon
 Homing pigeon
 List of pigeon breeds

References

External links
 National Pigeon Association - USA
 Purebred Pigeon Magazine
 National Young Bird Show - USA
 Fancy Pigeon Portraits
 Egypt Swifts - Pigeon News

Aviculture
Columba (genus)
Domesticated animals
Domestic pigeons